Glen Orin Mason (born April 9, 1950) is an American former college football player and coach. Mason served as the head football coach at Kent State University from 1986 to 1987, the University of Kansas from 1988 to 1996, and the University of Minnesota from 1997 to 2006, compiling a career college football record of 123–121–1.

Early life and playing career
Raised in Woodbridge Township, New Jersey, Mason attended Colonia High School.

Mason played college football at Ohio State University, graduating in 1972 with a B.A. in education. He was a linebacker on the depth chart behind Randy Gradishar, Stan White, Vic Koegel, Arnie Jones, and Rick Middleton.

Coaching career
Mason served as an assistant coach at Ball State University, Allegheny College, Iowa State University, the University of Illinois at Urbana-Champaign, and Ohio State University. He served as the outside linebackers coach and the offensive line coach at Ohio State in 1978 and 1979. In 1980, he was promoted to offensive coordinator of the Buckeyes and remained in that position through the 1985 season.

Mason was head coach for Kent State University in 1986 and 1987 and the University of Kansas from 1988 to 1996. In 1995, as Kansas prepared for the Aloha Bowl against UCLA, Mason accepted the head coaching position at the University of Georgia. Mason had a change of heart and stayed with the Jayhawks, but left for the University of Minnesota one season later. His first game with Minnesota in 1997 was against Hawaii, at Aloha Stadium, Minnesota lost the game, 17–3.

In January 2002, Mason was named the president of the American Football Coaches Association. He was the third Minnesota coach to be awarded this honor joining Bernie Bierman (1935) and Murray Warmath (1968). On December 31, 2006, Minnesota fired Mason immediately following the Gophers' 44–41 overtime loss to Texas Tech in the 2006 Insight Bowl, a game in which the Gophers blew a 38–7 third-quarter lead. At the end of the 2006 season, he had a career record of 123–121–1.

Following his tenure at Minnesota, Mason became a college football analyst and broadcaster for the Big Ten Network.

Personal
Mason has two children and lives in the suburbs of Minneapolis.

Head coaching record

See also
 List of presidents of the American Football Coaches Association

References

1950 births
Living people
American football defensive linemen
College football announcers
Allegheny Gators football coaches
Ball State Cardinals football coaches
Illinois Fighting Illini football coaches
Iowa State Cyclones football coaches
Kansas Jayhawks football coaches
Kent State Golden Flashes football coaches
Minnesota Golden Gophers football coaches
Ohio State Buckeyes football coaches
Ohio State Buckeyes football players
Ball State University alumni
Colonia High School alumni
Ohio State University College of Education and Human Ecology alumni
People from Woodbridge Township, New Jersey
Sportspeople from Middlesex County, New Jersey
Coaches of American football from New Jersey
Players of American football from New Jersey